Garett Maggart (born May 24, 1969) is an American actor. He is the son of fellow actor Brandon Maggart and half brother of singers Fiona Apple and Maude Maggart. He and his wife, Cynthia, have one son.

Filmography

Film

Television

External links 
 

1969 births
Living people
American male television actors